Wolf Parade is an EP by the Canadian indie band Wolf Parade. It was released on July 12, 2005, on Sub Pop. "Shine a Light" and an extended version of "You Are a Runner and I Am My Father's Son" appear on the band's Apologies to the Queen Mary.

Track listing

Personnel
 Dan Boeckner – guitar, vocals
 Spencer Krug – piano, keyboards, vocals
 Arlen Thompson – drums
 Hadji Bakara – keyboards, electronics
 Tim Kingsbury - bass (track 1)
 Isaac Brock - producer (tracks 3,4)
 Wolf Parade - producer (tracks 1, 2), mixing 
 Jace Lasek - mixing (tracks 3, 4)
 Chris Chandler - engineer (tracks 3, 4)
 Tony Gillis - mastering
 Matt Moroz - illustration, art direction
 Dusty Summers - layout

References

2005 EPs
Wolf Parade albums
Sub Pop EPs